Styracosceles is a genus of camel crickets in the family Rhaphidophoridae. There are at least four described species in Styracosceles.

Species
These four species belong to the genus Styracosceles:
 Styracosceles longispinosus (Caudell, 1916)
 Styracosceles neomexicanus (Scudder, 1894) (new Mexico camel cricket)
 Styracosceles oregonensis (Caudell, 1916)
 Styracosceles serratus (Rehn, 1905)

References

Further reading

 

Rhaphidophoridae
Articles created by Qbugbot